Engelmannia, or Engelmann's daisy, is a genus of North American flowering plants in the family Asteraceae.

 Species
 Engelmannia peristenia (Raf.) Goodman & C.A.Lawson - southern Great Plains of the central United States
 Engelmannia pinnatifida A.Gray ex Nutt. - Chihuahua, Coahuila, Nuevo León, Texas, New Mexico

References

External links
 
 

Heliantheae
Asteraceae genera
Flora of North America